Drum Theatre may refer to:

Drum Theatre (musical group), an 80s pop group
Drum Theatre (Plymouth), a theatre in Plymouth